Tüllüce Islet is an Aegean island of Turkey.

The sea around the island is one of the popular diving area.

References

Aegean islands
Islands of Turkey
Islands of Muğla Province
Bodrum District